Arwa Othman is a Yemeni writer, journalist, human rights activist and former Minister of Culture (2014–15) in the cabinet of President Abdrabbuh Mansur Hadi. Human Rights Watch has cited Othman as one of the "most outspoken activists calling for human rights and gender equality" during the 2011 Yemeni Revolution.

Career
Arwa Othman has headed the House of Folklore, a museum in Sana'a. In 2013 she was appointed to the Yemeni National Dialogue Conference, where she headed the Rights and Freedom Committee. Under her the committee recommended reforms for improving the lives of Yemeni women, making 18 the minimum age for marriage and action against people involved in the forced marriage of a child. In September 2013 she highlighted the case of an eight year old child bride who died of internal bleeding. However, Othman's advocacy also brought her to the notice of orthodox sections of society, from whom she received death threats.

Othman was one of the recipients of Human Rights Watch (HRW)'s Alison Des Forges Award for Extraordinary Activism in 2014. She was honoured for her activism against child marriage and advocacy for gender equality. She dedicated her award to the Jewish community residing in Yemen, her "brothers and friends from the Jewish community".

In November 2014 Abdrabbuh Mansur Hadi appointed Arwa Othman to the cabinet as Minister of Culture. The cabinet was dissolved in January 2015.

In 2017 she was among signatories condemning a wave of arrests of followers of the Baháʼí Faith in Yemen.

References

Year of birth missing (living people)
Living people
21st-century Yemeni journalists
Place of birth missing (living people)
21st-century Yemeni writers
Yemeni human rights activists
Women government ministers of Yemen
21st-century Yemeni politicians
21st-century Yemeni women politicians
Culture ministers of Yemen
People from Taiz Governorate